Leviathan is a steel roller coaster at Canada's Wonderland in Vaughan, Ontario, Canada. , Leviathan is ranked as the seventh-tallest roller coaster in the world and the fourth-tallest traditional lift-style coaster in the world.

Leviathan was the 16th roller coaster to be built at Canada's Wonderland. The ride was announced in August 2011, its track was completed in February 2012, and the first test run was completed on 15 March 2012. The coaster opened to season pass holders on 27 April 2012, and to the general public on 6 May 2012.

History 
Walter Bolliger admitted that he "owed" the park, as an inverted roller coaster could not be built several years earlier because of an exclusivity clause with Cedar Point.

Speculation about a new roller coaster at Canada's Wonderland began in early 2011, when construction work started around the Dragon Fyre ride and the Go Karts. On 3 July 2011, Canada's Wonderland launched a teaser website featuring a countdown clock to 18 August 2011, . accessible through the park's Facebook page. The website also featured quotations from online theme park reporters and Cedar Fair's CEO.

Announcement and construction

Erection of the track began during the week of 11 September 2011; the brake-run and station portions of track were completed by the end of September.

By mid–November the lift hill and drop were finished and the overbank turn was nearing completion. Construction continued through December and January, and the track was completed on 7 February 2012. The first test run was completed on 15 March 2012, and on 18 April 2012, Canada's Wonderland announced on its Facebook account that a  tunnel would be placed at the bottom of the ride's first drop.

First rider auction 
On 19 January 2012, Canada's Wonderland launched an auction in which bidders around the world competed to be one of the first ninety-six public riders on Leviathan on 27 April 2012, a week before the park officially opened the ride. The auction raised over 40,000, which was donated to the Hospital for Sick Children. The highest bid in the auction for a single seat was $1,000. When bidders got to ride the roller coaster, the tunnel at the bottom of the first drop was not yet installed.

Ride experience

, Leviathan is Bolliger & Mabillard's second tallest and fastest roller coaster, and the company's first giga coaster – a class of roller coasters with a height or drop that exceeds . One cycle of the ride lasts about 3 minutes and 28 seconds.

Layout

Following the first drop, the train goes through a  tunnel next to the Wonderland Terminal, then curves upwards into a  overbanked banked turn to the right. Both of these elements are located above the guest parking lot and in front of the park's main entrance. The train then traverses a smaller,  camelback, leading to a third high-speed turn which bends to the left and leads into the brake run and into the station.

Trains

Leviathan operates with three open-air steel and fibreglass trains coloured red, orange and yellow, respectively. The face of Leviathan, a theme element, covers the front of the trains. Each train has eight cars with four seats per car, which are styled after Bolliger & Mabillard's traditional hyper coaster cars, as opposed to the staggered seating used on Behemoth. Each train seats 32 riders, who are restrained using lapbars and seatbelts.

Track
The color of the track is cyan and its supports are blue. Leviathan uses a single chain for the lift hill.

Station and plaza

Leviathan's station has an elevator near the exit, wooden guard rails with slanted railings and two queues, one of which is the Fast Lane queue for pass holders. In front of the station, there is a rock fountain with a sculpture of a Leviathan on top. To the right of the sculpture, there is an arcade building that was renovated during the construction of the roller coaster. Unlike most of the park's attractions, Leviathan has its own gift shop.

Awards
Leviathan was ranked in the Amusement Today's Golden Ticket Awards for best new ride of 2012 with 14% of the vote, to come in third place.

See also
 List of rides at Canada's Wonderland
 2012 in amusement parks

References

External links

 Leviathan at Canada's Wonderland
 
 

Roller coasters in Ontario
Roller coasters operated by Cedar Fair
Hypercoasters manufactured by Bolliger & Mabillard